Sokpoe is a small town located near Sogakope in the Volta Region of Ghana.

Geography 

Sokpoe lies on the west bank of the Volta River. The Lower Volta Bridge connects Sokpoe directly to Sogakope.

References 

Populated places in the Volta Region